is an educational video game developed by Asmik Corporation for the Family Computer Disk System, and published by Sunsoft in 1987.

Super Boy Allan is the second installment in Sunsoft and Asmik's Intelligence Game trilogy. It is preceded by Adian no Tsue (1986), and followed by Chitei Tairiku Orudora (1987).

In the game, Allan Colada journeys from his home in the foothills into the mountains to retrieve a remedy for his sister Leela's fever.

Gameplay
To progress through most game screens, the player must push, kick, or pull logs to clear a path to the exit, as well as to solve arithmetic equations and inequality statements involving fractions.

The mechanics of the log-pushing puzzles are comparable to those in the Eggerland video game franchise, which in turn derive from Sokoban (1982). However, by using a rope (which are in limited supply), Allan can also pull a log away. Kicking a log toward an enemy defeats the enemy.

The design of the game world is patterned on Nintendo's action-adventure game The Legend of Zelda (1986).

See also
Donkey Kong Jr. Math (1983)
List of video games published by Sunsoft

References

1987 video games
Educational video games
Top-down video games
Asmik Ace Entertainment games
Famicom Disk System games
Famicom Disk System-only games
Sunsoft games
Video games developed in Japan